Patriarch Sarkis of Jerusalem may refer to:

Patriarch Sarkis I of Jerusalem (r. 1281–1313)
Patriarch Sarkis II of Jerusalem (r. 1394–1415)
Patriarch Sarkis III of Jerusalem (r. 1507–1517)

See also
List of Armenian Patriarchs of Jerusalem

Sarkis